Cubelets are a line of modular robotic construction toys manufactured by Modular Robotics. Cubelets are small robots that connect to create larger robot constructions, a kind of modular robot.

Cubelets connect magnetically with data and power passing through a genderless connector. Cubelets are sometimes used in educational settings such as K-12 classrooms and museum exhibits.

Operation
Each kind of Cubelet has a unique function and behavior. There are three categories of Cubelets - Sense, Think, and Act:
Sense Cubelets detect properties of the environment and turn them into data.
Think Cubelets modify and can share data throughout the robot construction.
Act Cubelets take the data they receive and turn it into action, like motion, sound or light.

MOSS system 

In 2013 Modular Robotics launched the MOSS robot construction system, a line of construction toys similar to Cubelets. MOSS modules connect via steel spheres and magnets located at the corner of each module. Each module has a specific function and combines to create a variety of simple robots.

References

External links 

 

Construction toys
Toy robots